Chaudhary Charan Singh International Airport  is an international airport serving Lucknow, the capital of the Indian state of Uttar Pradesh. It is located in Amausi,  from the city centre, and was earlier known as ''Amausi Airport''. It was later renamed in 2008 after Chaudhary Charan Singh, the fifth Prime Minister of India. It is owned and operated by the Lucknow International Airport Limited (LIAL), a public–private consortium led by Adani Group.

The airport is the 11th busiest airport in terms of passenger traffic in India. It handled around 2.5 million passengers, with 22,954 aircraft movements in the fiscal year 2020–2021 and handled around 5.5 million passengers, with 38,494 aircraft movement in the fiscal year 2019–2020. Due to the COVID-19 pandemic, passenger traffic declined by 55.1% in the FY 2020-2021 and aircraft movements by 40.4% in the same year.

The airport has two operational terminals (1 and 2), and one under construction passenger terminal (3) that will be completed by the end of 2023.

History
The airport was constructed in 1986 to facilitate service to corporate and government officials. With an increasing number of passengers, AAI decided to upgrade and expand the airport in 1996, owing to an increased number of passengers and the introduction of private operators in the sector.

On 17 July 2008, the Government of India officially renamed Amausi Airport to Chaudhary Charan Singh International Airport.

The second terminal (Terminal 2), equipped with latest technology, was then built in 2012 to handle the increasing domestic traffic. Terminal 2 was inaugurated and granted international status on 19 May 2012.

The construction of a third terminal (Terminal 3) for international operations was announced in 2016 in order to cater for the increasing passenger traffic. In 2018, the Government of India approved the new terminal 3 which is being built at INR 13.83 billion.

In February 2019, the Adani Enterprises led - Lucknow International Airport Limited (LIAL) won the rights of operations, management and development of the airport under the public-private partnership (PPP) model. As per the agreement, the airports would be handed to the company for a period of 50 years at the highest bid of 171 per passenger. The company will pay the per-passenger fee (PPF) to AAI for every domestic and international passenger handled at the airport.

Runway
CCSIA has ILS CAT IIIB capability on runway 27, which enables landing in low visibility conditions.

Delhi, Lucknow, Bangalore, Kolkata, Jaipur, and Amritsar are the only 6 airports in India with ILS CAT IIIB which helps flights land safely even with visibility as low as 50 metres.

Terminals
The airport has two operational terminals and one under construction:

Terminal 1
The original terminal, built to complement Charbagh Railway Station's architecture.
It has two arrival and three departing gates as well as two immigration counters.
The terminal was expanded in 1996.
It is now used for international flights after the opening of Terminal 2 in 2012.
Terminal 1 will be demolished in the second phase of the CCSI airport expansion project to link Terminal 2 and Terminal 3.

Terminal 2

Terminal 2 was originally built to become the international terminal. However, owing to the growing domestic traffic it was made the domestic terminal, leaving Terminal 1 to be the international terminal.
The terminal was inaugurated by then civil aviation minister Ajit Singh on 19 May 2012 before opening on 2 June 2012. With five boarding gates, Terminal 2 is used for domestic flights.
Terminal 2 of Lucknow Airport deals with huge passenger traffic every year.
Air traffic growth has put some pressure on aerodromes as of 2017.
Minister of State for Civil Aviation said, "project management consultant has been awarded for expansion of existing terminal building for an estimated cost of Rs 8.80 billion".
 Having area of 17,000 square metre, the terminal can handle 1200 passengers per hour and around 4 million passengers per year. The terminal was being used more than its capacity which led LIAL increasing the passenger handling capacity per hour by 200 passengers.
 The terminal was refurbished by the Adani Group in 2022 after takeover in 2020 as per it's plan to refurbish terminals of airports taken over form the AAI.

Terminal 3
In 2018, Suresh Prabhu, the then Minister of Civil Aviation, announced that a new third passenger terminal building will be constructed with an area of 1,11,367 sq.m., including a basement area of 20,461 sq.m. and a connecting corridor between Terminal 2 and Terminal 3, which will cover 6,646 sq.m. area. It will be able to serve more than 13 million passengers annually.

Its features are as follows:
It is being built at a cost of ₹ 1,383 crore (US$173 million).
Peak Hour Handling (PHP) capacity of the new terminal will be 4,000 passengers (3,200 domestic & 800 international).
There will be total 75 check-in counters (60 for domestic and 15 for international passengers) and 18 check-in kiosks for the passengers travelling through the terminal.
It will be installed with 15 aerobridges through which the passengers can board directly to the flight from their respective boarding gates.
It will be equipped with 30 lifts and 5 escalators.
In 2018, the construction of the terminal building was started by Nagarjuna Construction Company (NCC).
All design and interiors have been designed by the Pascal+Watson.
The first phase which includes the construction of Terminal 3 will be completed by the end of the year 2022. The second phase which includes the extension of part of Terminal 3 after demolition of Terminal 1 and constructing a connecting corridor between Terminal 2 and Terminal 3 will be completed by March 2023.
On 25 February 2019, Adani Group was awarded with the operations and expansion of the existing as well as the new Terminal 3.
It will be a multi-story terminal building with departures at the first floor and arrivals at the ground floor.
The terminal architecture will endeavor to express the position of Lucknow as a key city and will display the culture and heritage of Uttar Pradesh.
Strong references to traditional culture will be expressed by the building's architecture.
Arriving and departing passengers will sense this identity and reference to place.
The building will be provided with interior decorations to match the modern structure.
Along with the terminal, a multi-story parking facility is also under construction, which will have a parking of 1,500 vehicles. Terminal 3 is expected to be completed by mid-2023.

Cargo Terminal

Opened in March 2022.
The facility has increased the cargo handling. capacity of the CCSI airport by 40 per cent to 7000 tonne per year. The airport plans to increase the capacity to over 1000 tones per month by the end of 2022–2023.
At present, e-commerce, courier, auto parts, Post Office mails, general cargo, valuables, mobile phones, and perishables are exported as well as imported at Lucknow Airport.
The airport is also in talk with various multi-national companies to use Lucknow as a regional distribution hub.

Airlines and destinations

Statistics

Future

Airport expansion 
The runway expansion from 2744 m to 3200 m started on 23 February and will last until July.
The Adani Group will invest Rs 10,700 crore into Lucknow Airport's expansion so that its annual passenger handling capacity zooms from 4 million passengers per annum (MPPA) to 39 MPPA.
The airport's expansion plan received clearance from the Union Environment Ministry on December 15. However, the plan submitted to the ministry did not mention the deadline for the expansion.
The plan of Lucknow International Airport Limited (LIAL), an Adani group company, said: “CCSIA (Chaudhary Charan Singh International Airport) in Lucknow has a total land area of 509.41 hectares (1258.80 acres), making it one of the most land-constrained airports in India.” LIAL now proposes expansion of CCSIA within an area of 457.1 hectares, it added.
Along with Terminal 3, a new terminal building (Terminal 4), 3 parallel taxiways along the runway with associated infrastructure, support facilities, and utilities will be built to accommodate 39 MPPA, the plan noted.
Total built up area for Terminal 4 along with Terminal 3 modification would be 4,26,131 square meter whereas the total footprint area of Terminal 4 and Terminal 3 modification would be 1,39,020 square meters 
LIAL's plan said a cargo complex would be developed at CCSIA in a total area of 23.14 hectares to handle cargo up to 0.25 million tonnes per annum.
During its construction phase, the expansion project will employ about 2,000 people directly and indirectly, and once operational, about 25,000 people will be employed, the plan said.
A multi-modal transport hub — which includes metro connectivity, multi-level car parking, cityside check-in and self-bag drop facility, and curbside facilities for passengers/visitors arriving at the airport from surrounding areas — will also be developed, it said.
LIAL has proposed multi-level car parking to accommodate 4,000 car spaces, the plan noted.
“Pedestrian walkways are planned to connect multi-level car parking to terminal departure and arrival areas, for passengers and greeters to park in multi-level car parking and walk down to the pickup/drop off kerbs,” it mentioned.
About 9.6 million liters per day (MLD) of water would be required to handle 39 MPPA, it said. 4.5 MLD will be supplied by the Uttar Pradesh government or borewells and the remaining 5.1 will be sourced from the sewage treatment plant for landscaping and flushing, it added.

Aero City

A concession Agreement for Operation, Maintenance, Management & Development of Airside and Landside area of Chaudhary Charan Singh International Airport (CCSIA) has been signed between Airports Authority of India (AAI) and Lucknow International Airport Limited (LIAL) (earlier known as Adani Lucknow International Airport Limited) on 14 February 2020. As a part of concession agreement between AAI & LIAL, 110 acres has been allotted to LIAL for City Side development. Adani Airport Holdings Limited has been granted rights to undertake development, operation, management and maintenance of City Side of Chaudhary Charan Singh International Airport (CCSIA) Airport vide a Master Services Agreement dated 18 May 2021 ("MSA") executed between Lucknow International Airport Limited (LIAL) and Adani Airport Holdings Limited and is authorized to obtain required approvals from statutory authorities.

Out of the total land area available for City Side Development. M/s Adani Airport Holdings Limited proposes its phase-I development, on plot area of about 15.36 acres, i.e. 62,182.69 sqm and Built-up area of 3,47,423 sq. m, for which Environment Clearance is being sought. Under the provision of EIA notification 2006, amended until date.

The project is a mixed-use development that comprises the following: 
Retail space (Multiplex, Entertainment, Virtual Reality, and F&B)
Business Centre (Convention Center and Flexi Office)
Hotel
Associated connectivity, utilities and facilities

The total population of project will be 31,108 persons.

Adequate provision will be made for the heavy vehicle parking at the project site to allow smooth movement at the site. The proposed parking area will be 4087 ECS.

The total project cost of the proposed City Side Development project is 1116.50 crores.

The Aero City will be constructed between the new Terminal 3 and the CCSIA Metro Station. Estimated date of completion for the project is 2026.

Connectivity

Railways
Amausi Railway Station is one of the suburban railway stations of Lucknow. It lies on the Lucknow - Kanpur Suburban Railway Line and is just  from the airport.

Metro

 CCSIA and Amausi are the metro stations on the Red Line of the Lucknow Metro that connects the airport to the rest of the city.

CCSIA metro station is situated at the front of the Terminal 2.
Amausi metro station is situated at just 1 km from the Terminal 2.

Cabs and taxi
 and  cabs are available at both Terminal 1 and Terminal 2 that serves to and from the city.

Local buses
The LCTS supplies the Air-Conditioned and Non-AC buses from the Airport to the Charbagh Railway Station as well as the rest of the city.

Awards

The airport was awarded AAI's "Best Airport" award in July 2013 along with Jodhpur Airport.
Lucknow Airport was rated second-best in the category of small airports catering to 5–10 million passengers per annum by Airports Council International, a global non-profit organization of airport operators.
In 2018, Lucknow Airport was awarded the best airport in the category "Best Airport by Size and Region (2–5 million passengers per year in Asia-Pacific Region)" by the Airports Council International.
The Passenger Terminal 2 Building's Architects, S. Ghosh & Associates were awarded the NDTV-Grohe Infrastructure Architecture Design of the Year Award in 2014 for the project.
In 2019, the Airport was awarded first position in ASQ awards in Asia Pacific region for 5 to 15 million capacity pet annum by Airport Council International (ACI).
In January 2021, Lucknow Airport was accredited in the Airports Council International (ACI) Airport Health Accreditation programme. The global recognition demonstrates extraordinary proactive measures put in place by the airport to ensure passenger safety.
In January 2023, Assocham announced the best regional airport awards for Lucknow and Ahmedabad airports.

See also
Lal Bahadur Shastri International Airport
Airports in India
List of busiest airports in India

References

External links

Transport in Lucknow
Airports in Uttar Pradesh
International airports in India
Buildings and structures in Lucknow
Memorials to Chaudhary Charan Singh
Airports established in 1986
1986 establishments in Uttar Pradesh
20th-century architecture in India